Khvor Khvoreh Rural District is a rural district (dehestan) in the Central District of Bijar County, Kurdistan Province, Iran. At the 2006 census, its population was 4,622, in 1,041 families. The rural district has 24 villages.

References 

Rural Districts of Kurdistan Province
Bijar County